Saint-Vallier-de-Thiey (Provençal: Sant Valier de Tièir) is a commune in the Alpes-Maritimes department in southeastern France.

Geography
It is located some 12 kilometres northwest of the famed perfume centre of Grasse on the D6085 highway.

Saint-Vallier-de-Thiey and its surrounding area are rich in stone megaliths (particularly great table-shaped stone dolmens) and Bronze Age relics, probably more than anywhere else in the South of France. The most impressive dolmen is called "Verdoline," just south of the village; it may date from as early as 4500 BC and its chamber measures some 1½ X 2 metres (5 X 6½ feet). Near this dolmen is the "Druids' Stone," a rock cylinder created by erosion.

Along the roads from Saint-Vallier-de-Thiey toward Saint-Cézaire-sur-Siagne and going west into the valley of the Siagne River a number of ancient tumuli burial mounds many may be seen.

Landforms

Saint-Vallier-de-Thiey has magnificent woodlands which overhang both environmental and landscaping points of view. These woodlands are classified under L.130-1 of the Town Planning Code.

The main surrounding peaks are:
Sommet de Thiey (1 553 m)
Montagne du Cheiron (1 778 m)
Montagne de l'Audibergue3

Hydrography and groundwater

The following rivers flow through Saint-Vallier-de-Thiey: 
Siagne,
Vallon de Nans,
Vallon de la Combe.
Vallon de Saint-Christophe.

The village has a purification plant with a capacity of 2500 equivalent-inhabitants.

Population

Sport
Saint-Vallier-de-Thiey is home to the Riviera Cricket Club and Beausoleil Cricket Club.

See also
 Route Napoléon
Communes of the Alpes-Maritimes department

References

Communes of Alpes-Maritimes
Alpes-Maritimes communes articles needing translation from French Wikipedia